is a 100-metre-tall (328 ft) lattice tower located in Beppu, Ōita, Japan. Initially built to help boost tourism in the area, today the tower is primarily used as TV transmission tower.

History
Beppu Tower was built in two years, from 1956 to 1957 and was originally planned to open the Beppu Tourism Exhibition, held from March 20 through May 20, 1957. Construction was slightly delayed, however, and the tower was not completed until May 10, ten days before the exhibition ended. Its original name was  until 1961 when it was officially changed to Beppu Tower. 

The tower first displayed advertising for National. Currently, it displays eight neon Asahi signs—four in English, four in Japanese.

In popular culture
Godzilla vs. SpaceGodzilla

See also
 List of towers

References

External links 
 

Beppu, Ōita
Buildings and structures in Ōita Prefecture
Tourist attractions in Ōita Prefecture
Observation towers in Japan
Towers completed in 1957
1957 establishments in Japan